Mir Publishers was a major publishing house in the Soviet Union which continues to exist in modern Russian Federation. It was established in 1946 by a decree of the USSR Council of Ministers and has headquartered in Moscow, Russia since then. It was completely state funded, which was the reason for the low prices of the books it published.

Its scope was domestic and translated special and tutorial literature in various domains of science and engineering: mathematics, physics, chemistry, biology, agriculture, transport, energy, etc. Many Soviet scientists and engineers were its contributors. The staff provided translation from original Russian. In addition, during the Soviet times it was known for translated foreign scientific and popular science books as well as science fiction. Many of Mir's books were and are used as textbooks for studies of science in many countries.

The publishing house survived after the dissolution of the Soviet Union and was eventually privatised and later expanded its scope by incorporating a number of state publishing houses:  Kolos (Колос), Transport (Транспорт), Khimiya (Химия), Metallurgiya (Металлургия), Legprombitizdat (Легпромбытиздат), and Energoatomizdat (Энергоатомиздат).

In 2008, the company faced a bankruptcy case.
The case was closed by the Moscow Arbitral Court on June 2, 2009 because the publishing house had paid completely the debt to the creditors.

Note: its old domain, mir-publishers.net, is squatted.

Book series

English language
 Advances in Science and Technology in the USSR: Biology Series
 Advances in Science and Technology in the USSR: Chemistry Series
 Advances in Science and Technology in the USSR: Mathematics and Mechanics Series
 Advances in Science and Technology in the USSR: Physics Series
 Advances in Science and Technology in the USSR: Technology Series
 Higher Mathematics Series
 Little Mathematics Library
 Science for Everyone

French language
 Science soviétique

Spanish language
 Ciencia Popular
 Los Científicos a los Escolares (CE)
 Física al Alcance de Todos
 Lecciones Populares de Matemáticas

References

External links
 Mir Books | Books from the Soviet Era
 Online copies of books published by Mir Publishers at Wayback Machine

Publishing companies established in 1946
Publishing companies of the Soviet Union
1946 establishments in the Soviet Union